The black foxface (Siganus niger) is a species of marine ray-finned fish, a rabbitfish belonging to the family Siganidae. It is endemic to Tonga in the western Pacific Ocean.

Taxonomy
The black foxface was first formally described in 1990 by the ichthyologist David J. Woodland with the type locality given as Euakafa Island in the Vava'u Group of Tonga. This species is sometimes placed  with the other four species of "foxfaced rabbitfishes" in a subgenus of the genus Siganus called Lo. The specific name niger means black, a reference to the dark colour of this species.

Description
The black foxface, like almost all of the other rabbitfishes, has 13 spines and 10 soft rays in its dorsal fin and 7 spines and 9 soft rays in its anal fin. The overall colour is almost completely black but the pectoral fins are yellow as is the margin of the soft rayed part of the dorsal fin, the anal fin and the caudal fin. There is a broad white stripe on the gill cover which is overlain with a vermiculated pattern.

Distribution and habitat
The black foxface is endemic to Tonga in the Western Pacific Ocean, although it is only common in the northernmost Tongan island group of Vava'u. This species shows a preference for areas where there are staghorn or fire corals, and where there rubble mounds made up of flat and staghorn corals.

Biology
The black foxface lives in pairs as adults, the juveniles are thought to school. It feeds on macroalgae. They are known to change colour and pattern when alarmed. This species produces venom in the spines of its fins. In a study of the venom of a congener it was found that rabbitfish venom was similar to the venom of stonefishes.

Utilisation
The black foxface appears in the aquarium  trade. It is also targeted by spear fishers and the catch is sold fresh.

References

Siganidae
Fish described in 1990
Taxa named by David J. Woodland